William Head Institution is a Canadian minimum-security federal correctional institution for men located in Metchosin, British Columbia, about  southwest of Victoria on the southernmost tip of Vancouver Island. The Institution opened in 1959 and can house 200 inmates. The institution is based on a residential design, composed of five neighborhoods of clustered duplexes; each neighborhood of four duplexes is designed to function as a community.  William Head provides variety of Educations, Correctional Programs and Vocational Trainings.

Facility Characteristics

Federal Institution for male offenders. 

Security level: Minimum Security.

Date opened: 1959.

Number of inmates: 125.

Average length of sentences:

- Less than 36 months: 17 per cent of inmates.

- 36 months and over: 28 per cent of inmates.

- Life sentence: 55 per cent of inmates.

Number of employees: 101.

Reported:
March 2023

Operational Information

Institution mailing address:		

William Head Institution

6000 William Head Road, Victoria, BC, V9C 0B5

Telephone Number:

250-391-7000

Visiting Hours for Inmate Visitors:

Thursdays & Fridays: 19:00hrs – 22:00hrs

Saturdays, Sundays and Holidays: 09:00hrs – 11:45hrs & 12:45hrs – 17:00hrs

William Head Quarantine Station

Before becoming a jail, the site was used as an immigration control quarantine station from 1883 to 1958 to handle arrivals on the west coast and from 1917 to about 1918 as a training (drill) depot for the Chinese Labour Corps (CLC) during World War I. It is also final resting place for 21 members of the CLC, who died en route to or from the war in Europe. William Head was named for explorer Sir William E. Parry and was built to replace Albert Head Quarantine Station. The quarantine station was closed in 1958 and converted to use as a prison.

See also

Other quarantine stations in Canada:
 Melville Island (Nova Scotia)
 Partridge Island
 Grosse Isle
 Windmill Point

References

Prisons in British Columbia
Quarantine facilities in Canada